Illinois Emergency Management Agency (IEMA) is an agency of the state of Illinois responsible for preparing for and coordinating responses to emergencies.  It replaced the Illinois Civil Defense Agency in 1975 under House Bill 1109.

Function
The primary responsibility of IEMA is to better prepare the State of Illinois for natural, man-made or technological disasters, hazards or acts of terrorism. IEMA coordinates the State's disaster mitigation, preparedness, response and recovery programs and activities, functions as the State Emergency Response Commission, and maintains a 24-hour Communication Center and State Emergency Operations Center (SEOC). The SEOC acts as lead in crisis/consequence management response and operations to notify, activate, deploy and employ state resources in response to any threat or act of terrorism. IEMA assists local governments with multi-hazard emergency operations plans and maintains the Illinois Emergency Operations Plan.

References

External links 
Official site
Ready Illinois

Emergency Management
Emergency services in Illinois
1951 establishments in Illinois
Government agencies established in 1951